Triphoroidea is a superfamily of minute sea snails, marine gastropod molluscs or micromolluscs within the informal group Ptenoglossa.

Taxonomy
Families and subfamilies within this superfamily are as follows:
 † Berendinellidae Guzhov, 2005 
 Cerithiopsidae H. Adams & A. Adams, 1853
 Newtoniellidae Korobkov, 1955
 Triphoridae J.E. Gray, 1847
Families brought into synonymy  
 Eumetulidae synonym of Newtoniellidae
 Triforidae synonym of  Triphoridae

References

Taxonomy.nl

Ptenoglossa
Taxa named by John Edward Gray